The Kalamazoo Book Arts Center (KBAC) is a nonprofit organization of artists and writers located in Kalamazoo, Michigan.

History 
KBAC was founded by Jeff Abshear in 2005 to create a community workshop and educational space focused on the arts of book design and printing, fine printmaking, papermaking, bookbinding, and creative writing. The center is located at the Park Trades Center on Kalamazoo Avenue in downtown Kalamazoo. The organization is supported by grants (including the National Endowment for the Arts), and community support.

Programs 
KBAC has regular on-site book arts workshops. KBAC created and hosts the "Poets in Print" reading series. KBAC participates in the Arts Council of Greater Kalamazoo's monthly Art Hop!

References 

Visual arts education
Artists' books
Book arts
Bookbinding
Papermaking in the United States
Printmaking groups and organizations
Arts centers in Michigan
Arts organizations established in 2005